Richard J. Helldobler is an American educator, who currently serves as the eighth president of William Paterson University in Wayne, New Jersey. He assumed office on July 1, 2018, after serving as interim president of Northeastern Illinois University in Chicago. A trained dancer and theatre director, he was the founding artistic director of CalRep Pennsylvania and The Mon Valley Ballet Theatre at California University of Pennsylvania. As of 2021, he serves as Board Co-Chair of LGBTQ Presidents in Higher Education and serves on the board of the American Association of State Colleges and Universities.

References 

Year of birth missing (living people)
Living people
William Paterson University faculty
Northeastern Illinois University faculty
Heads of universities and colleges in the United States